Konrad Winkler (born 17 February 1955 in Neuhausen) is a former East German Nordic combined skier who competed during the late 1970s and early 1980s.

He won a gold medal in the Nordic combined Individual event at the 1978 FIS Nordic World Ski Championships in Lahti, then finished second behind Tom Sandberg in the same event in 1982. Winkler earned bronzes in the Individual Nordic combined events at the 1976 Winter Olympics and at the 1980 Winter Olympics. Winkler won gold in the 3 x 10 km event at the 1982 championships.

References
 

1955 births
Living people
German male Nordic combined skiers
Nordic combined skiers at the 1976 Winter Olympics
Nordic combined skiers at the 1980 Winter Olympics
Olympic Nordic combined skiers of East Germany
Olympic bronze medalists for East Germany
Olympic medalists in Nordic combined
FIS Nordic World Ski Championships medalists in Nordic combined
Medalists at the 1976 Winter Olympics
Medalists at the 1980 Winter Olympics
People from Mittelsachsen
Sportspeople from Saxony